Elk Hill, also known as North Knob  or Elk Mountain, is a mountain in Herrick Township, Pennsylvania. It is the highest mountain peak in Pennsylvania east of the Susquehanna River and the highest peak on the Allegheny Plateau. 

Elk Hill rises conspicuously above the surrounding landscape. The mountain actually has two peaks. It is home to Elk Mountain Ski Area which has a  vertical drop and 27 ski trails.

References

Mountains of Pennsylvania
Landforms of Susquehanna County, Pennsylvania